Shakespeare in Love is a play by Lee Hall adapted from the film of the same title.

Production
The play premiered at the Noël Coward Theatre in London's West End on 22 July 2014. It was produced by Disney Theatrical Productions and Sonia Friedman Productions and directed by Declan Donnellan, with design by Nick Ormerod and music by Paddy Cunneen. The original cast included David Oakes appearing as Marlowe, Tom Bateman as Will, and Lucy Briggs-Owen as the heroine Viola De Lesseps. The production closed on 18 April 2015.

The production played to sold-out audiences during the 2016 Stratford (Ontario, Canada) Festival season. The director of the production was Declan Donnellan, with the rest of the original creative team from London show returning for the Canadian production.

The first U.S. production of the play occurred on 18 February 2017, at the Oregon Shakespeare Festival.  The play was produced at the Burbage Theater of Pawtucket, Rhode Island, as the first presentation of its 2018–2019 season.

In 2017, the first South African production of the play took place at The Fugard Theatre (Cape Town, South Africa). It was directed by Greg Karvellas, produced by Eric Abraham and starred Dylan Edy as William Shakespeare alongside Roxane Hayward as Viola De Lesseps. It played to sold-out audiences and, due to its success, was brought back in 2018 with Hayward reprising her role, opposite Daniel Mpilo Richard stepping in as Shakespeare.

In 2018, the Japanese version of the play was produced by Shiki Theatre Company. The script was translated by Matsuoka Kazuko, and the production was directed by Aoki Go. It was staged in Tokyo, Kyoto, and Fukuoka.

In 2023, the Korean version of the play was produced by Shownotw. The production was directed by Kim Dong-yeon. It was staged at CJ Towol Theater in Seoul.

Cast
Original London Company

 Lucy Briggs-Owen as Viola de Lesseps
 Tom Bateman as William Shakespeare
 David Oakes as Christopher 'Kit' Marlowe
 Paul Chahidi as Philip Henslowe
 Alistair Petrie as Lord Wessex
 Doug Rao as Ned Alleyn
 Anna Carteret as Elizabeth I of England
 Ian Bartholomew as Edmund Tilney
 David Ganly as Richard Burbage
 Abigail McKern as Nurse
 Ferdy Roberts as Hugh Fennyman
 Patrick Osborne as Wabash
 Harry Jardine as Sam
 Colin Ryan as John Webster
 Richard Howard as Sir Robert De Lesseps
 Charlie Tighe as Nol / Musician
 Tony Bell as Ralph
 Thomas Padden as Boatman / Musician
 Elliott Rennie as Catlin / Musician
 Timothy O'Hara as Ensemble
 Daisy Boulton as Ensemble
 Janet Fullerlove as Ensemble
 Michael Chadwick as Ensemble
 Sandy Murray as Ensemble / Dance Captain
 Tim van Eyken as Ensemble / Musical Director

Cast from 12 January 2015

 Eve Ponsonby as Viola de Lesseps
 Orlando James as William Shakespeare
 Edward Franklin as Christopher 'Kit' Marlowe
 Neal Barry as Philip Henslowe
 Nicholas Asbury as Lord Wessex
 Ryan Donaldson as Ned Alleyn
 Suzanne Burden as Elizabeth I of England
 Richard Bremmer as Edmund Tilney and Sir Robert de Lesseps
 Peter Moreton as Richard Burbage
 Joy Richardson as Nurse
 Paul Brennan as Hugh Fennyman
 Ncuti Gatwa as Wabash
 Gregg Lowe as Sam
 Stuart Wilde as John Webster
 Charlie Tighe as Nol / Musician
 Thomas Padden as Boatman / Musician / Musical Director

 Elliott Rennie as Catlin / Musician
 Andy McKeane as Ralph
 Aaron Anthony as Ensemble
 Jonno Davies as Ensemble
 Florence Roberts as Ensemble
 Sioned Jones as Ensemble
 Ellie Nunn as Ensemble
 Sandy Murray as Ensemble / Dance Captain
 Nick Hart Ensemble / Musician

References

External links
http://www.independent.co.uk/arts-entertainment/theatre-dance/news/shakespeare-in-love-to-get-west-end-play-8937636.html

2014 plays
Cultural depictions of William Shakespeare
Plays based on real people
Plays set in London
Plays set in the 16th century
Disney Theatrical Productions plays
Plays by Lee Hall (playwright)
Plays based on films